Wailing may refer to:

 A heavy form of crying, usually accompanied by sobbing (see also weeping (disambiguation))
 Wailing Wall, ancient limestone wall in the Old City of Jerusalem, Israel
 Murder Obsession, a 1981 Italian film also known as The Wailing
 The Wailing (2016 film), a South Korean film
 The Wailing (upcoming film), a Spanish-French-Argentine horror film
 Wailing, a 1956 album by Buddy Arnold